Justin Peter Cobb  is a British professor of orthopaedic surgery at Imperial College London, known for introducing medical robotics into orthopaedic surgery. He is a member of the Royal Medical Household and was royal orthopaedic surgeon to the Queen. He is on the staff at King Edward VII's Hospital (KEVII) and is civilian advisor in orthopaedics to the Royal Air Force (RAF). His research has also included themes relating to designing new devices such as for ceramic hip resurfacing, 3D printing in orthopaedics, and training in surgical skills. He is a director of the MSk laboratory based in the Sir Michael Uren Hub.

Cobb was a demy at Magdalen College, Oxford, from where he graduated in 1982. He completed his early surgical training at St Thomas' Hospital, The Middlesex and the Royal National Orthopaedic Hospital (RNOH). In 1991 he was appointed consultant at The Middlesex and University College Hospital (UCH), and worked at the London Bone Tumour Unit, and in trauma and general orthopaedics. He is a recipient of the Hunterian Professorship, awarded for his work on surgery and osteosarcoma. Together with engineer Brian Davies from Imperial, he developed the world's first haptic based robotic assistant known as 'Acrobot', used to assist in knee surgery.

In 1999 he operated on the wounded following the London nail bombings, and he treated the injured following the 2005 attacks in London.

Education and training

Justin Cobb was a demy at Magdalen College, Oxford, from where he graduated in 1982. He moved to London as a senior house officer in 1984, and completed his junior surgical training before rotating through orthopaedic firms at St Thomas', The Middlesex and the RNOH, including working for Sir Rodney Sweetnam in 1985. At the RNOH, as orthopaedic registrar, his work with Gordon Blunn and Peter Walker in the Biomedical Engineering Unit, led to being awarded the Hunterian Professorship. He completed his master's in 1991 with a thesis titled "Prognostic factors in operable osteosarcoma".

Surgical career
In 1991 Cobb was appointed consultant at The Middlesex and UCH, and worked at the London Bone Tumour Unit, and in trauma and general orthopaedics. In 1992, he delivered the Hunterian oration.

In 1992 he received his first grant from the special trustees of The Middlesex and UCH, for the purpose of research in robotics in orthopaedic surgery. Together with engineer Brian Davies from Imperial College, his work led to the development of 'Acrobot', the world's first haptic based robot for orthopaedics. In 1999 they co-founded the spinout 'Acrobot'. Cobb operated with the robot first in 2000. Acrobot was originally designed to be used in total knee replacement surgery with application for use in unicompartmental knee arthroplasty (UKA). It allowed the surgeon to stay in touch with the patient and control the cutting tool at the same time as moving the robotic arm. He subsequently reported a randomized, double-blinded study comparing the Acrobot with traditional knee surgery. It showed that the tactile-guided robot-assisted UKA was more precise than the traditional manually performed UKA. Where only 40% of traditionally operated knees were in the desired orientation, all of the robotic assisted knees were found to be within the desired two degrees offsimon orientation. Acrobot was acquired by Stanmore Implants in 2010. When the FDA approved Acrobot for clinical use in the USA, Mako surgical acquired the company, prior to Stryker acquiring Mako. His research has also included themes relating to designing new devices such as for ceramic hip resurfacing, 3D printing to allow a minimally invasive joint preservation surgery, training in surgical skills, and looking at the impact of exercise, disability and drugs on bone health and material properties.

In 1999, along with plastic surgeon Gus McGrouther, he treated the wounded following the London nail bombings. He was appointed chair of orthopaedics at Imperial College London in 2005. That year he had also treated the wounded of the 2005 London bombings. As member of the Royal Medical Household, he was appointed royal orthopaedic surgeon to the Queen in 2008. He is on the staff at King Edward VII's Hospital, and within the Royal Air Force, he is a civilian advisor.

MSk laboratory

Cobb is credited for developing the MSk laboratory at Imperial's Charing Cross campus, later based in the Sir Michael Uren Hub. Sir Michael Uren pledged £40m towards a building designed as a hub for scientists, engineers, clinicians and patients. It was opened in December 2020 with Cobb and Alison McGregor as the MSk Lab's directors.

Honours
Cobb was appointed Commander of the Royal Victorian Order (CVO) in the 2023 New Year Honours for his services as orthopaedic surgeon to the Queen.

Personal and family
In 1985, he married Iona, a general practitioner, and they have four children.

Selected publications

Books

Articles

See also
List of honorary medical staff at King Edward VII's Hospital for Officers

Footnotes

References

External links

Video following Soho bomb blast 1999 (May 1999)

21st-century British medical doctors
Year of birth unknown
Year of birth missing (living people)
British orthopaedic surgeons
Alumni of Magdalen College, Oxford
Academics of Imperial College London
20th-century British medical doctors
Living people
Date of birth missing (living people)